Anganur is a village in the Sannasinallur panchayat Sendurai taluk of Ariyalur district, Tamil Nadu, India, located 14 km from Sendurai and 8 km from Tittakudi. The river called as Chinna aaru (small river) crossing this village. Thol Thirumavalavan, the Dalit activist, was born here.

References 

3. Pin Code Anganur

Villages in Ariyalur district